Parthenius III (died 24 March 1657) was Ecumenical Patriarch of Constantinople in 1656–1657. In 1657 he was charged with treason by the Ottoman Sultan and hanged, after refusing to abjure his own Christian faith. He is hence revered as New Hieromartyr Parthenius III and his feast day in the Eastern Orthodox Church is March 24.

Life
Parthenius was born in the island of Lesbos, and in 1639 he was elected metropolitan of Chios. On 26 July 1656 he became Ecumenical Patriarch, succeeding Joannicius II.

Parthenius, who sided with the Russians in the clashes for the control of the Church in the Ukraine, in 1656 denounced the 1643 Confession of Faith of the previous Metropolitan of Kiev Peter Mogila, which he deemed to be too close to the Catholic doctrine. The Confession of Faith of Peter Mogila had been however already approved by all the Greek-speaking Patriarchs in 1643, and it was again approved in 1662 by Patriarch Nectarius of Jerusalem and by the 1672 Synod of Jerusalem. Parthenius also held a burial for the remains, recovered on a shore, of his predecessor Cyril Lucaris, who was killed in 1638 on a ship in the Sea of Marmara and his corpse thrown in the waters.

In order to raise funds, Parthenius sent letters to a Greek bishop in the Tsardom of Russia, at the time a political enemy of the Ottoman Empire. His correspondence was intercepted and delivered to the Grand Vizier Mehmed Köprülü, who decided that Parthenius should stand for trial charged of treason. Though the accusations were proven false, Sultan Mehmed IV ordered his hanging in order to "set an example for those who may try that in future". The only option he was given to be freed was to convert to Islam, but Parthenius refused.

Thus on 24 March 1657 a long procession walked with Parthenius from his prison to a place in Istanbul named "Gate of the Hook" (Parmak Kapi) where he was hanged. He stayed hanged for three days and then was thrown into the sea. His body was found by Christians and was buried in the Kamariotissa Monastery on the island of Chalki.

Notes

17th-century Greek clergy
1657 deaths
17th-century Eastern Orthodox martyrs
17th-century Ecumenical Patriarchs of Constantinople
Christian saints killed by Muslims
People from Lesbos
Christians executed for refusing to convert to Islam
People executed by the Ottoman Empire by hanging
Executed Greek people
Year of birth unknown
Greek Orthodox bishops of Chios